Zimbabwe has many different cultures, which may include beliefs and ceremonies, one of them being Shona. Zimbabwe's largest ethnic group is Shona.

History

Language 

Zimbabwe has 16 official languages, Chewa, Chibarwe, English, Kalanga, "Koisan" (presumably Tsoa), Nambya, Ndau, Ndebele, Shangani, Shona, "sign language" (Zimbabwean sign languages), Sotho, Tonga, Tswana, Venda, and Xhosa. Much of the population speaks Bantu languages, such as Shona (chishona) (76%) and Ndebele (18%). Shona has a rich oral tradition, which was incorporated into the first Shona novel, Feso by Solomon Mutswairo, published in 1957. English is spoken primarily in the cities, but less so in rural areas. Education in Zimbabwe is taught in English, Shona and Ndebele. Many rural primary schools teach in the native language until grade three; then, school is taught in English.

Food 

Like in many African countries, a majority of Zimbabweans depend on staple foods. "Mealie meal", or cornmeal as it is known in other parts of the world, is used to prepare bota, a porridge made by mixing cornmeal with water, to make a thick paste. This is usually flavored with butter or peanut butter. Bota is usually eaten for breakfast. Cornmeal is also used to make sadza, which is usually eaten for dinner, and by many for lunch too. The process of making sadza is similar to bota, however after the paste has been cooking for several minutes, more cornmeal is added to thicken the paste until it is firm. This meal is usually served with vegetables (spinach, chou moellier, or spring greens/collard greens), beans, and meat (stewed, grilled, roasted, or sundried). Sadza is also commonly eaten with boerewors (a sausage made from beef or pork), chicken, or curdled milk (sour milk), commonly known as "lacto" (mukaka wakakora or "amasi"). Rice and chicken with coleslaw salad is often served as the main meal. Graduations, weddings, and any other family gatherings will usually be celebrated with the killing of a goat, sheep, or cow, which will be braaied (or barbecued) for the gathered family.

Since Zimbabwe was a British colony, they have adopted some English habits. For example, most people will have porridge in the morning, however they will still have 10 o'clock tea (midday tea). They will have lunch, which can be leftovers from the night before, freshly cooked sadza, or sandwiches (which is more common in the cities). After lunch, there is usually 4 o'clock tea (afternoon tea), which is served before dinner. It is not uncommon for tea to be had after dinner.

Art 

Traditional arts in Zimbabwe include pottery, basketry, textiles, jewelry and carving. Among the distinctive qualities are symmetrically patterned woven baskets and stools carved out of a single piece of wood. Shona sculpture in modern times has become a fusion of African folklore with European influences. It is widely respected across the globe and it itself has had an impact on the global sculpture scene since at least the 1980s. A recurring theme in Zimbabwean art is the metamorphosis of man into beast. Cartwark, M. is of the view that ,A number of finely carved soapstone figures have been found which include eight representations of birds perched on monoliths over one metre (39 inches) in height. The bird is known as the Zimbabwe Bird and does not resemble any bird in nature; it appears on the flag of the country today. Such artefacts as the soapstone figures hint at the ritual nature of the Great Zimbabwe site. Other sculptures include cattle and nude highly-stylised female figures. Simple unglazed pottery of very good quality was produced - very often given a graphite covering and then polished. Forms include gourd-shaped vessels with distinctive hatched triangular decorations, small disks of uncertain purpose, and models of huts.

Among members of the white minority community, theatre has a large following, with numerous theatrical companies performing in Zimbabwe's urban areas.

The country's art is admired by those that know of its existence, and several Zimbabwean artists have managed to gain a world audience. To name some world-famous Zimbabwean sculptors, we have Nicholas, Nesbert and Anderson Mukomberanwa, Tapfuma Gutsa, Henry Munyaradzi, and Locardia Ndandarika. Internationally, Zimbabwean sculptors have managed to influence a new generation of artists, particularly African Americans, through lengthy apprenticeships with master sculptors in Zimbabwe. Contemporary artists, including New York sculptor M. Scott Johnson and California sculptor Russel Albans have learned to fuse both African and Afro-diasporic aesthetics in a way that travels beyond the simplistic mimicry of African Art by some Black artists of past generations in the United States.

Zimbabwe's cultural wall is the durawall.

See also 
 Architecture of Zimbabwe
 Balancing Rocks
 Education in Zimbabwe
 Reps Theatre and Over the Edge (Zimbabwe Theatrical Companies)
 Music of Zimbabwe
 Rhodesiana
 Zimbabwean legends

References 

 Cartwright, Mark. "Great Zimbabwe." World History Encyclopedia. Last modified March 14, 2019. https://www.worldhistory.org/Great_Zimbabwe/.

Further reading 
 
 
 
 </ref>